Emalahleni Local Municipality is an administrative area in the Chris Hani District of the Eastern Cape in South Africa. 	Emalahleni is an isiXhosa name meaning "a place of coal".

Politics 

The municipal council consists of thirty-four members elected by mixed-member proportional representation. Seventeen councillors are elected by first-past-the-post voting in seventeen wards, while the remaining seventeen are chosen from party lists so that the total number of party representatives is proportional to the number of votes received. In the election of 1 November 2021 the African National Congress (ANC) won a majority of twenty-eight seats on the council.
The following table shows the results of the election.

Main places
The 2001 census divided the municipality into the following main places:

References

External links
 Official website

Local municipalities of the Chris Hani District Municipality